{{Speciesbox
| genus = Anaerocolumna
| species = aminovalerica
| authority = (Hardman and Stadtman 1960) Ueki et al. 2016
| synonyms = *Clostridium aminovalericum
}}Anaerocolumna aminovalerica'' is a species of bacteria belonging to the family Lachnospiraceae.

References 

Bacteria described in 1960
Lachnospiraceae